The 1972 UC Riverside Highlanders football team represented the University of California, Riverside as a member of the California Collegiate Athletic Association (CCAA) during the 1972 NCAA College Division football season. Led by first-year head coach Wayne Howard, UC Riverside compiled an overall record of 9–1 with a mark of record of 3–0 in conference play, sharing the CCAA title with Cal Poly. The team outscored its opponents 207 to 113 for the season. The Highlanders played home games at Highlander Stadium in Riverside, California.

Schedule

References

UC Riverside
UC Riverside Highlanders football seasons
California Collegiate Athletic Association football champion seasons
UC Riverside Highlanders football